Josef Carl Peter Neckermann (5 June 1912 – 13 January 1992) was a German equestrian and Olympic champion. He won Olympic medals at four different Olympics, in 1960, 1964, 1968 and 1972. Later Neckermann became a member of the West German National Olympic Committee.

He was also the founder and owner of the German mail order company Neckermann AG in 1938.

Biography 

He benefited greatly from the Nazi forced hostile takeover of Jewish businesses, including the 1938 acquisition of Karl Amson Joel's retail business in Berlin.

For that, shortly after World War II, Neckermann was sentenced to one year in a military prison.

In 1957, Joel got a compensation of 2 million West German marks for his former company from Neckermann who ran the most successful German mail order selling company at the time.

Family 

Neckermann's daughter Eva Maria Pracht and granddaughter Martina Pracht were also Olympic equestrians.

References

External links 

 

1912 births
1992 deaths
German dressage riders
Olympic equestrians of the United Team of Germany
Olympic equestrians of West Germany
German male equestrians
Olympic gold medalists for the United Team of Germany
Olympic bronze medalists for the United Team of Germany
Olympic gold medalists for West Germany
Olympic silver medalists for West Germany
Olympic bronze medalists for West Germany
Equestrians at the 1960 Summer Olympics
Equestrians at the 1964 Summer Olympics
Equestrians at the 1968 Summer Olympics
Equestrians at the 1972 Summer Olympics
Grand Crosses with Star and Sash of the Order of Merit of the Federal Republic of Germany
German company founders
20th-century German businesspeople
Olympic medalists in equestrian
Recipients of the Olympic Order
Burials at Frankfurt Main Cemetery
Medalists at the 1972 Summer Olympics
Medalists at the 1968 Summer Olympics
Medalists at the 1964 Summer Olympics
Medalists at the 1960 Summer Olympics